Ireland is a hamlet in the civil parish of Southill,  Bedfordshire, England.

The hamlet was known as Inlonde in the 16th century.

References

External links

Hamlets in Bedfordshire
Central Bedfordshire District